The 22909 / 22910 Valsad–Puri Superfast Express is a Superfast Express train belonging to Indian Railways – Western Railway zone that runs between  and  in India.

It operates as train number 22909 from Valsad to Puri and as train number 22910 in the reverse direction serving the states of Gujarat, Madhya Pradesh, Chhattisgarh, and Odisha.

On 24 January 2019, Second upgraded rake of Western Railway under ‘Project Utkrisht’ with beautiful interiors & many passengers friendly new features was introduced in Valsad–Puri Superfast Express.

Coaches

The  22909/22910 Valsad–Puri Superfast Express running with new LHB rake from 28  March 2019 instead of ICF rake which has 2 AC 2 tier, 6 AC 3 tier, 8 Sleeper Class, 4 General Unreserved & 2 EOGs (End On Generation) coaches. It does not carry a pantry car.

As is customary with most train services in India, coach composition may be amended at the discretion of Indian Railways depending on demand.

Route and halts

The important halts of the train are:

Traction

Both trains are hauled by an Itarsi electric loco shed-based WAP-7 locomotive on its entire journey.

Reversals

The train reverses its direction two times at;

   
 .

Schedule

Rake sharing

The train shares its rake with 19055/19056 Valsad–Jodhpur Weekly Express.

References

External links

Transport in Valsad
Transport in Puri
Express trains in India
Rail transport in Gujarat
Rail transport in Madhya Pradesh
Rail transport in Odisha
Rail transport in Chhattisgarh
Railway services introduced in 2011